The Rhineland is an area of Western Germany along the river Rhine.

Rhineland or Rheinland may also refer to:

Places 
 Canada
 Rural Municipality of Rhineland, Manitoba
 Municipality of Rhineland, Manitoba, successor to the rural municipality
 Rhineland (electoral district), a former Manitoba provincial electoral district
 Rhineland, Ontario

 Germany
 Rhineland-Palatinate, a Bundesland (federal state) of Germany

 The Netherlands
 Rijnland, Dutch for Rhineland, a historical region of the Netherlands around the Rhine

 United States
 Missouri Rhineland, an area of Missouri
 Rhineland, Missouri, a populated place in the center of the Missouri Rhineland
 Rhineland, Texas, an unincorporated community

Other uses 
 6070 Rheinland, an asteroid
 Ford Rheinland, an automobile built by Ford Germany from 1933 to 1936
  a number of ships with this name
 , a German battleship, 1908–1922
  a British cargo ship in service 1948–56

See also
 Rhinelander (disambiguation)